Josie Baff (born  25 January 2003 Cooma) is an Australian snowboarder. She competed in the 2022 Winter Olympics, in Women's Snowboard Cross, and Mixed team snowboard cross.

She competed at the 2020 Winter Youth Olympics, and 2021–22 FIS Snowboard World Cup.

References

External links 

 Josie Baff Interview | Olympics | Off The Podium Podcast Episode 211 - YouTube

2003 births
Living people
People from Cooma
Australian female snowboarders
Snowboarders at the 2022 Winter Olympics
Olympic snowboarders of Australia
Snowboarders at the 2020 Winter Youth Olympics
Medalists at the 2020 Winter Youth Olympics
Youth Olympic gold medalists for Australia
Sportswomen from New South Wales
21st-century Australian women